Quadrisemicoscinium is an extinct genus of fenestrate bryozoan, known from the Early Devonian period, of the family Semicosciniidae. It formed net-like colonies of relatively thick branches with two rows of autozooids per branch, supported by a vesicular skeleton.

Species
Three species are recognized.

References

Devonian bryozoans
Stenolaemata
Prehistoric bryozoan genera